Aleksander Mackiewicz (6 September 1944 – 14 June 2022) was a Polish politician. A member of the Alliance of Democrats, he served as minister of internal market from 1989.

Mackiewicz died on 14 June 2022 at the age of 77.

References

1944 births
2022 deaths
Polish economists
Government ministers of Poland
Alliance of Democrats (Poland) politicians
University of Warsaw alumni
People from Chemnitz